Black-headed batis may refer to:

 Eastern black-headed batis (Batis minor), found in eastern Africa
 Western black-headed batis (Batis erlangeri), found in central Africa

Birds by common name